Le Gendre Starkie  may refer to:
 Le Gendre Starkie (1799–1865), MP for Pontefract 1826–1830
 Le Gendre Starkie (1828–1899), MP for Clitheroe 1853–1857